The Liberal Party of Canada ran 242 candidates in the 1940 Canadian federal election, and elected 179 members to form a second consecutive majority government.

Provinces

Alberta

Source: Library of Parliament.

References

1940